Giorgio Orelli (May 25, 1921 – November 10, 2013) was an Italian-speaking Swiss poet, writer and translator.

He was born in Airolo in the canton of Ticino and was educated at the University of Fribourg, where he was a student of the Roman philologist Gianfranco Contini. He taught Italian Literature at the Higher School of Commerce in Bellinzona.

Giorgio Orelli was a post-hermetic poet. In the anthology of Piero Chiara and Luciano Erba he appeared as a poet of the Fourth Generation. Called the Tuscan from Ticino by Gianfranco Contini, Orelli was often associated with the "Lombard Line" of "sober moral realism".

He was also known as a translator of Goethe and Andri Peer. He contributed to various literary magazines (Il Verri, Paragone, Letteratura). His cousin Giovanni Orelli was also a writer and poet.

Giorgio Orelli died in Bellinzona in 2013. He was the cousin of the writer Giovanni Orelli and the uncle of the alpine skier Michela Figini.

Poetic works

Né bianco né viola, Lugano, Collana di Lugano, 1944.
Prima dell'anno nuovo, Bellinzona, Leins e Vescovi, 1952. 
Poesie, Milan, Edizioni della Meridiana, 1953. 
Nel cerchio familiare, Milan, Scheiwiller, 1960. 
L'ora del tempo, Milan, Arnoldo Mondadori Editore, 1962. 
6 poesie, Milan, Scheiwiller, 1964. 
5 poesie, con 5 seriografie di Madja Ruperti, San Nazzaro, Switzerland, Serigrafia San Nazzaro, 1973.
Sinopie, Milan, Arnoldo Mondadori Editore, 1977. 
Spiracoli, Milan, Arnoldo Mondadori Editore, 1989.  
Il collo dell'anitra, Milan, Garzanti, 2001.

Poems translated in English

 by Jean Garrigue, Translations by American Poets, Ohio University Press, Ohio, 1970
 by Lynne Lawner, 
 by Marco Sonzogni ,

Proses

Un giorno della vita, Milan, Lerici, 1960. 
Pomeriggio bellinzonese in Luci e figure di Bellinzona negli acquerelli di William Turner e nelle pagine di Giorgio Orelli, a cura di Virgilio Gilardoni, Bellinzona, Casagrande, 1978.

Translations

Johann Wolfgang Goethe, Poesie scelte, Milan, Arnoldo Mondadori Editore, 1974.

Essays

Accertamenti verbali, Milan, Bompiani, 1978.
Quel ramo del lago di Como, Bellinzona, Casagrande, 1982 e 1990. 
Accertamenti montaliani, Bologna, Il Mulino, 1984. 
Il suono dei sospiri, Torino, Einaudi, 1990. 
Foscolo e la danzatrice, Parma, Pratiche, 1992.
La qualità del senso. Dante, Ariosto e Leopardi, Bellinzona, Casagrande, 2012.

Awards

 1944 Premio Lugano
 1960 Premio Città di Firenze, Premio Libera Stampa
 1979 Honorary Degree, University of Fribourg 
 1988 Grand Prix Schiller of the Swiss Schiller Foundation
 1997 UBS Culture Foundation
 2001 Premio Piero Chiara
 2002 Bagutta Prize
 2008 BSI Award

External links
 
 
 Official Website (Italian)

Notes

References 

 Andri Peer, Giorgio Orelli: An Italian Poet from Switzerland, Books Abroad, 1971, p. 247-251
 John L. Flood, Modern Swiss Literature: Unity and Diversity, London, 1985
 P.V. Mengaldo, Poeti italiani del Novecento, Mondadori, 2003
 C. Mésoniat, Giorgio Orelli, poeta e critico, Casagrande, 1980
 John Butcher and Mario Moroni (Ed.), From Eugenio Montale to Amelia Rosselli: Italian Poetry in the Sixties and Seventies, Leicester, 2004
 Luciano Anceschi, Linea lombarda, Magenta, Varese, 1952
 Pietro De Marchi, Dove portano le parole. Sulla poesia di Giorgio Orelli e altro Novecento, Manni, Lecce, 2002

1921 births
2013 deaths
People from Airolo
Swiss writers
People from Bellinzona
Translators of Johann Wolfgang von Goethe